King is the seventh studio album by American alternative rock group O.A.R. It was released on August 2, 2011 by Wind-up Records. This is their first album on the label.

Reception

King received mixed reviews from critics upon release. On Metacritic, the album holds a score of 60/100 based on 5 reviews, indicating "mixed or average reviews".

Track listing

Personnel
O.A.R.
Marc Roberge - vocals, guitar, programming and additional instrumentation on track 1
Richard On - guitar
Benj Gershman - bass
Jerry DePizzo - saxophone, guitar
Chris Culos - drums

Additional musicians
 Mikel Paris - keyboards, percussion, backing vocals on all tracks
 DJ Logic - turntables on track 1
 Russell Simmons- additional vocals on track 1
 The Plain Clothes Choir - additional vocals on track 4
 Josh Smith - trumpet on tracks 1, 3, 5, 11, 13, 17
 Sam Blankesse - trombone on tracks 1, 3, 5, 11, 13, 17
 Ryan Baharloo - programming and additional instrumentation on tracks 4, 13
 John O'Brien - programming and additional instrumentation on track 19
 Jerry Barnes - programming and additional instrumentation on all tracks

Charts

References

External links
O.A.R official website

Further reading
O.A.R New Album Ready
O.A.R New Album Buzz is "King" Sized
King Album Review
O.A.R Targets 2011 for New Album, Sets Fall Tour

2011 albums
O.A.R. albums
Albums produced by Matt Wallace